Norman McKenzie (born 7 May 1946) is a New Zealand former cricketer. He played two first-class matches for Otago in 1972/73.

See also
 List of Otago representative cricketers

References

External links
 

1946 births
Living people
New Zealand cricketers
Otago cricketers
People from Kurow